Llanddulas Limestone and Gwrych Castle Wood is a Site of Special Scientific Interest in the preserved county of Clwyd, north Wales.  The designated area lies in the communities of Betws yn Rhos, Llanddulas and Rhyd-y-foel and Llysfaen. The hills of Cefn-yr-Ogof and Craig y Forwyn feature.  Gwrych Castle Wood is part of Gwrych Castle, a privately owned estate.

See also
List of Sites of Special Scientific Interest in Clwyd

References

Sites of Special Scientific Interest in Clwyd
Betws yn Rhos
Llanddulas and Rhyd-y-Foel